"Hey Mr. DJ" is a popular song  written by the Northern Irish singer Van Morrison and recorded on his 2002 album, Down the Road. It was released as a single in the U.K. and charted at number fifty-eight. The single includes two popular Morrison compositions as the B-side; both have been included in the compilation album Still on Top - The Greatest Hits.

The Rolling Stone reviewer, David Fricke, said, "'Hey Mr. DJ' is a requiem for the one-on-one electricity of pre-Clear Channel radio, swinging with sweet brass and the iconic echo of Sam Cooke's 'Having a Party'."

Recording history
The song was originally recorded in 2000 with Linda Gail Lewis, intended for an album entitled Choppin' Wood. Before the release of the album, Lewis' contributions to the song were removed and string and vocal overdubs were added.

Personnel
Van Morrison - acoustic guitar, vocals
John Allair - Hammond organ
Crawford Bell - backing vocals
Olwin Bell - backing vocals
Lee Goodall - tenor and alto saxophones
Mick Green - acoustic guitar, electric guitar
Karen Hamill - backing vocals
David Hayes - bass guitar, double bass
Matt Holland - trumpet
Bobby Irwin - drums
Siobhan Pettit - backing vocals
Johnny Scott - backing vocals
Rosie Wetters - cello, string section leader
Aine Whelan - backing vocals

Appearances on other albums
This song was included on the compilation album, The Best of Van Morrison Volume 3.
"Hey Mr. DJ" is included on the 3CD limited edition of the 2007 compilation album, Still on Top - The Greatest Hits, as the opening song on the third CD.

Notes

References
Heylin, Clinton (2003), Can You Feel the Silence? Van Morrison: A New Biography, Chicago Review Press, 

2002 singles
Van Morrison songs
Songs written by Van Morrison
Song recordings produced by Van Morrison
2000 songs
Polydor Records singles